Atractus vertebralis, the vertebral ground snake,  is a species of snake in the family Colubridae. The species can be found in Peru.

References 

Atractus
Endemic fauna of Peru
Reptiles of Peru
Reptiles described in 1904
Taxa named by George Albert Boulenger